Nepalese Society in Trondheim (NeST) is a registered non-profit organization in Trondheim. It was established in 1998 by Nepalese students residing in Trondheim, Norway and has been running by the voluntary efforts of existing and new members each year. Most of the members of Nepalese Society in Trondheim has been students studying at NTNU and HIST. Every year many new Nepalese arrive in Trondheim mostly as the student in NTNU or HIST and get the membership of NeST as well. It has about 80 members, mostly students, and other alumni and permanent residents living in Trondheim.

Every year, in Autumn, a new Executive Committee is formed after the Annual General Meeting. The Annual General Meeting is organized by the running Executive Committee, and the election is performed according to its constitution. The main objective of NeST has been to help the Nepalese student residing in Trondheim to adjust to Norwegian lifestyle, help in building a rapport with Norwegians and other international students and committees, make the members involved in different kinds of Cultural events, educational events, as well as other recreational activities.

Nepalese Cultural Evening 
NeST organizes Nepalese Cultural Evening program every year in Spring. The main motive behind the program is to introduce Nepal, its culture, and typical Nepalese food to non-Nepalese. The tradition has been going on since 2008 and getting popular each year. The Program starts with a small exhibition of items imported from and representing Nepal. The main program usually lasts for one and half hour to two hours in which cultural dance, musical performances, theatrical acts, documentaries and quiz games are conducted. The final and the most popular part of the program is the dinner where typical Nepalese cuisines are served along with typical Nepalese desserts.

References

External links
 Official page of NeST
 Facebook Page

Student organisations in Norway